Chali Gewog (Dzongkha: ཆ་གླིང་) is a gewog (village block) of Mongar District, Bhutan. In 2002, the gewog contained 263 households and covered an area of 42 square kilometres.

Economy 
The principal agricultural products are maize, paddy, barley, buckwheat, oranges and vegetables.

More than 60% of the population have access to piped drinking water supply and 30% of the households
have electricity. The gewog has a community school with 258 students but relies on Mongar for most of the facilities. The farmers of Tashipong are dependent upon spring water.

The villagers mainly engage in subsistence farming but vegetable and animal products (such as cheese, butter and eggs) are sold at the market.

Politics 
Administratively, Chhali Gewog is a part of the dzongkhag of Mongar District. In November 2007, the people of Chhali elected former General Secretary of the Bhutan Olympic Committee Pema Tenzin as their National Council candidate.

References 

Gewogs of Bhutan
Mongar District